Mark "Haz" Hazinski (born April 20, 1985, in South Bend, Indiana) is an American professional table tennis athlete. He started playing table tennis at the age of 9 and by the age of 15 had become the youngest player in the history of United States Table Tennis to make the United States Men's National Table Tennis Team. Hazinski simultaneously represented the United States Men's Team and United States Junior Team for 4 consecutive years (2000-2003).

As a youth Hazinski was professionally trained by United States Olympic Head Coach Danny Seemiller and United States Junior Coach Mark Nordby. Hazinski spent multiple years (2004–2006) playing professional sports leagues in Germany and Sweden. In 2007 Mark decided to put his professional career on hold to attend Texas Wesleyan University on a full scholarship for academics and Table Tennis.

Career

Hazinski's professional career can be dated back to 2000, at the age of 15 when he first made the United States Men's National Team. Here are some of Hazinski's top accolades during that time period:
2004 United States Olympic Team Member
United States Men's National Team Member
United States U18 National Team Member
United States Men's U21 National Champion (6x Gold Medalist)
2003 United States Table Tennis Player of the Year
United States National Men's Singles Finalist (4x Silver Medalist)
United States Pan American Team Member (2007 Bronze Medalist).
National Collegiate Table Tennis Men's Singles Champion 
2011 Most Outstanding Athlete Award (Texas Wesleyan University)

In Hazinski's early career he enjoyed training and playing professionally in Europe. From 2004 to 2005 he played for Oberalster VFW Club in Hamburg, Germany and in 2005-06 he played for Ängby Sportklubb in Stockholm, Sweden. After his season ended in Sweden, Hazinski decided to further pursue an education and attended Texas Wesleyan University, located in Ft. Worth, Texas. While attending Texas Wesleyan University (TWU), he held the # 1 Collegiate Table Tennis position for over 200 consecutive weeks, making him one of the most dominant collegiate players of all time.

Personal life

Hazinski married Shu "Sara" Fu in December 2008. Sara is from Chengdu, China but moved to the United States in 2005 to play and coach table tennis in California. Mark graduated from Texas Wesleyan University in May 2012 with a B.S. degree in Sports Medicine.

As of 2018, Hazinski is a head coach at North Texas Table Tennis Center and a professional table tennis athlete that competes in major United States table tennis sanctioned tournaments. 

Hazinski is an avid golfer and Dallas Mavericks basketball fan. He is friends with Indiana Pacers head coach Rick Carlisle and has done table tennis exhibitions during the halftime entertainment periods for the Mavericks regular season games.

References

Sources

External links
 
 
 

1985 births
Living people
American male table tennis players
Olympic table tennis players of the United States
Pan American Games medalists in table tennis
Pan American Games bronze medalists for the United States
Table tennis players at the 2004 Summer Olympics
Table tennis players at the 2007 Pan American Games
Table tennis players at the 2011 Pan American Games
People from Mishawaka, Indiana
Sportspeople from South Bend, Indiana
Medalists at the 2007 Pan American Games
Texas Wesleyan Rams
Texas Wesleyan University alumni
21st-century American people